

The Dalles Commercial Historic District comprises a primarily commercial and civic portion of downtown The Dalles, Oregon, United States. Strategically located at the eastern end of the Columbia River Gorge and near Celilo Falls, The Dalles became the preeminent transportation and trading hub of the interior Northwest in the 19th and early 20th centuries. The 46 historic buildings and other features of the district, built between 1860 and 1938, reflect the city's status and evolution as the gateway to the Columbia Plateau and the commercial, governmental, and cultural center of Eastern Oregon.

The district was added to the National Register of Historic Places in 1986.

See also
National Register of Historic Places listings in Wasco County, Oregon
The Dalles Carnegie Library
The Dalles Civic Auditorium
United States Post Office (The Dalles, Oregon, 1916)
Granada Theater (The Dalles, Oregon)

Notes

References

External links

The Dalles, Oregon
Historic districts on the National Register of Historic Places in Oregon
National Register of Historic Places in Wasco County, Oregon